The Pediciidae or hairy-eyed craneflies are a family of flies closely related to true crane flies, with about 500 species worldwide.

Description

For terms see Morphology of Diptera.

Pediciidae are medium-sized to large  (5 mm., Dicranota 35 mm., Pedicia) flies which resemble Tipulidae. The wings, legs and abdomen are long and slender. Ocelli are absent. The eyes are pubescent; short erect hairs are present in between the eye facets (the eyes are usually glabrous in related families). The antenna have 12-17 segments. The thorax has a V-shaped transverse suture. The wing  has 2 anal veins. The apical crossveins and M-Cu form an oblique line. The wings of Pedicia have contrasting brown longitudinal stripes.

Genera
Subfamily Pediciinae
Dicranota Zetterstedt, 1838
Heterangaeus Alexander, 1925
Malaisemyia Alexander, 1950
Nasiternella Wahlgren, 1904
Nipponomyia Alexander, 1924
Ornithodes Coquillett, 1900
Pedicia Latreille, 1809
Savchenkoiana Kocak, 1981
Tricyphona Zetterstedt, 1837
Subfamily Ulinae
Ula Haliday, 1833

References

External links
Family :Pediciidae  at EOL images.

 
Nematocera families